All Saints', Granby is a Church of England parish church in Granby, Nottinghamshire, England. The building is Grade I listed by the Department for Digital, Culture, Media and Sport for outstanding architectural or historic interest.

History
The church is medieval (with fragments dating from the 12th century), but it was reduced in size and the tower repaired about 1777. The chancel originally had a terracotta east window, which was replaced by one of stone during restoration work in 1888. Fragments of the original, including two incomplete heads, lie in the chancel. Within a 1958 south porch is a heavily moulded, 13th-century doorway in Early English style.

Parish status
All Saints' Church, Granby is in the Wiverton group of parishes, which includes:
St Andrew's Church, Langar
St Giles's Church, Cropwell Bishop
Holy Trinity Church, Tythby
St John's Church, Colston Bassett
St Mary's Church, Barnstone (not currently in use)
St Michael and All Angels' Church, Elton on the Hill

Services are held in Granby about once a month. The post of priest in charge is vacant at present.

External sources
A detailed history of the church and its parish: Retrieved 5 January 2016.

References

Church of England church buildings in Nottinghamshire
Grade I listed churches in Nottinghamshire
Diocese of Southwell and Nottingham